The United Church in Papua New Guinea and Solomon Islands is a United church in the Methodist and the Reformed tradition.

It was formed in 1968 by merging the efforts of the London Missionary Society (operating exclusively in Papua), the relatively marginal Presbyterian church (largely confined to Port Moresby itself) and the Methodist mission (largely operating in New Guinea and nearby islands, the western and northern Solomons and the islands of eastern Papua).

Since 1996, there is a United Church in Papua New Guinea and a separate United Church in Solomon Islands.

History

 
The formation of the United Church pre-dates the merger of its corresponding (and one missionary parent though Methodists from New Zealand) denominations in Australia in 1977 in the Uniting Church in Australia but such cross-denominational mergers were common throughout the 20th century, particularly in Commonwealth countries: for example; the United Church of Northern India (1924) (now merged in the later and wider Church of North India, Church of Pakistan, and Church of Bangladesh); the United Church of Canada (1925) and the Church of South India (1947). It is particularly strong on the Papuan coast, the Southern Highlands, eastern Papua, the New Guinea Islands (including Bougainville, also known as the North Solomons), and the Western Solomons. Unlike the Anglican and Roman Catholic churches in Papua New Guinea for reasons of church tradition as well as for Anglicans' cultural attitudes where it is substantial, the United Church welcomes female clergy. Like Presbyterian, Methodist, Congregationalist and United or Uniting churches elsewhere, its services are primarily for worship with scripture lessons, prayers and sermons, communion being once in a month or every few months. As these denominations in western countries have in recent years lost many members and participants to a lack of worship at all in recent decades, the United Church of Papua New Guinea and Solomon Islands has lost some to more fundamentalist sects.

Local and overseas affiliations
The United Church is a member of the Papua New Guinea Council of Churches, Melanesian Council of Churches and the World Council of Churches. In matters of social policy it tends as with its sister denominations in other Commonwealth countries to be largely in accord with the Anglican and Lutheran churches.

Traditionally, many of the United Church's personnel were recruited from earlier-established Methodist and Congregationalist churches in Fiji, Samoa, and Tonga; the United Church continues to have close relations with sister churches in these neighbouring island countries. Its theology and social policy tends to be somewhat more akin to these theologically conservative neighbouring countries' long-established evangelical Protestant churches than to those in Australia. On the other hand, the Church is considerably more broad-minded in such matters than more recently arrived fundamentalist groups, and it maintains the historic Methodist and Congregational strong emphasis on education and literacy in the broadest sense. As with the Anglican and Lutheran churches, the United Church has suffered some attrition in recent decades as a result of aggressive proselytising among its constituents by fundamentalist and pentecostalist groups originating in the United States of America and, to a lesser extent, Australia.

Many of Papua New Guinea's leaders have had a United Church background.

Eminent United Churchmen and Churchwomen
Rabbie Namaliu
Mekere Morauta
Paulias Matane
Bill Skate
Buri Kidu
Mari Kapi

Literature
 Neville Threlfall, One Hundred Years in the Islands. The Methodist/United Church in the New Guinea Islands Region 1875–1975, The United Church (New Guinea Islands Region), Toksave na Buk dipatmen: Rabaul 1975,

See also
Anglican Church of Papua New Guinea
Evangelical Lutheran Church of Papua New Guinea

References

Churches in Papua New Guinea
Churches in the Solomon Islands
Papua New Guinea
United and uniting churches
Christian organizations established in 1968
Christian denominations established in the 20th century
1968 establishments in the United Kingdom